Jeuxvideo.com (from jeux vidéo;) is a French video gaming website founded in 1997.

History 
The website traces its history to a video game hint collection on Minitel, a precursor to the World Wide Web, and was founded by Sébastien Pissavy while on military service in 1995. As his work became more popular, he moved it to a website, Jeuxvideo.com, in 1997. Gameloft purchased an 80% share of the site in 2000, though Pissavy ran it independently until his departure in 2012. HiMedia purchased the site in 2006 and sold it in 2014 to Webedia for 90 million euros. Webedia subsequently moved the offices to Paris, causing several staff members to leave. In August 2015, the site was hacked; administrators said no private information was leaked but still advised users to change their passwords.

Forums 
Jeuxvideo.coms forums have caused it controversy and legal problems. The forums are often compared in spirit to 4chan and have few rules. L'Obs and Le Monde have both criticized the forums for their hatred and intolerance. Forum posters have also uncovered controversies, such as making plagiarism claims against popular YouTube users.

References

External links 
  

Internet properties established in 1997
Video game Internet forums
Video game news websites
French entertainment websites
1997 establishments in France